Melantrich ( - Publishing House Melantrich) was a large Czech language publishing house connected with the Czech National Social Party. Established in 1897, the publisher remained in existence until 1999.

In 1897 the Czech National Social Party (no relation to German National Socialism) was founded after a split within the Czechoslavonic Social Democratic Workers' Party. The new party set up a publishing house "Knihtiskárna národně sociálního dělnictva" ("Printing press of national socialist workers") on July 9, 1897. The party also started a daily, Česká demokracie ("The Czech Democracy"), led by Václav Klofáč, without much of success.

In 1907 Jaroslav Šalda, a talented worker from the printing press, together with Klofáč started a new daily České slovo ("The Czech Word"). The newspaper proved to be successful and in 1910 the publishing house bought building "Hvězda" ("The Star") on the Wenceslaus Square. The company adopted name "Melantrich" after a renaissance publisher Jiří Melantrich of Aventino (born Jiří Černý Rožďalovický; c.1511, Rožďalovice - November 19, 1580, Prague). The building was renamed to "Melantrich" after the 1922 reconstruction.

In 1919 the company, obtaining an official permit, started to publish several newspapers and journals (including the first tabloid in the Czech lands, Pražský ilustrovaný zpravodaj). In 1924 Melantrich became joint stock company. In 1926  printing press "Koppe & Bellmann" from Smíchov was acquired. In 1928 a branch in Ostrava was established, in 1934 branch in  Brno and later branch in Žilina. During the 1930s Melantrich got involved in movie production and in commercial graphics. In 1936 a music publishing "MelPa" (Melantrich + Pazdírek) was established. It was one of the largest publishers of books in the country. The spectrum of literature published by Melantrich was very wide and included works by many contemporary Czech writers, such as Božena Benešová, Jan Čep, Jaroslav Durych, Egon Hostovský, Josef Kopta, Vítězslav Nezval, Ivan Olbracht, and Vladislav Vančura. The circulation of some newspapers and journals reached hundreds of thousands, in few cases (Večerní slovo, weekly Svobodný zítřek) more than one million.

Led by Šalda, Melantrich became the largest publisher in the First Republic of Czechoslovakia. After the Nazi occupation (1939) the company managed to stay in business but Šalda was imprisoned (in 1941) and the control was taken over by Nazi collaborators. After the war Šalda, unwilling to participate in politics any more, was removed by the party from his executive position. České slovo was renamed to Svobodné slovo ("The Free Word") in 1945.

After the communist takeover of power in 1948 Šalda got ousted, the company nationalized and split into three parts. In 1950 the Czechoslovak Socialist Party (the party changed its name) was granted the right to control the company again while the state remained as the formal owner. (This settlement led to litigations after 1989.) In 1950 the publishing house changed its name to "Svobodné slovo-Melantrich", in 1960 to "Svobodné slovo" and again in 1967 back to "Melantrich".

During the Velvet Revolution (1989) a balcony of Melantrich building served as a tribune for speakers to the masses of protesters gathered on Wenceslaus Square. The socialist party later used this balcony as the main symbol of their (eventually unsuccessful) election campaign in 1990.

The first half of the 1990s was spent in disputes and litigations who is the new owner of the company. The newspaper Svobodné slovo changed the editor-in-chief many times while the circulation steadily declined. In 1996 Melantrich was bought by a media company, part of the Chemapol group. Svobodné slovo was renamed to Slovo ("The Word") and in 1998 sold out. Chemapol went bankrupt in 1998. The publishing house was, like many other large traditional publishers in the Czech Republic, unable to compete and closed down in 1999.

Afterwards, the Melantrich building was turned into a luxurious hotel.

Literature
 Libuše Pešková: Publikační činnost nakladatelství Melantrich od založení do vzniku 2. světové války (Publication activities of Melantrich until World War II)], Charles University, 1975. A diploma work with complete bibliography from the 1918-38 period. (Czech)

External links

 History of Melantrich: short overview

Publishing in the Czech Republic